Ren Keli (born 1936) was a People's Republic of China politician. He was born in Wuwei County, Anhui. He was Chairman of the Henan People's Congress (1998–2003). He was a delegate to the 6th National People's Congress (1983–1988), 7th National People's Congress (1988–1993) and 9th National People's Congress (1998–2003). He was on the Standing Committee of the 10th National People's Congress (2003–2008) and 11th National People's Congress (2008–2013).

References
 

1936 births
People's Republic of China politicians from Anhui
Chinese Communist Party politicians from Anhui
Delegates to the 6th National People's Congress
Delegates to the 7th National People's Congress
Delegates to the 9th National People's Congress
Living people
Politicians from Wuhu